Virginio Fasan (F 594) was a Bergamini-class frigate of the Italian Navy.

Construction and career 
She was laid down on 6 March 1960 and launched on 9 October 1960 by Navalmeccanica. She was commissioned on 10 October 1962.

Carlo Margottini and Virginio Fasan were discarded in 1988 respectively.

Gallery

References 

 Blackman, Raymond V. B. Jane's Fighting Ships 1962–63. London: Sampson Low, Marston & Company, 1962.
 Blackman, Raymond V. B. Jane's Fighting Ships 1971–72. London: Sampson Low, Marston & Company, 1971. .
 Gardiner, Robert and Stephen Chumbley. Conway's All The World's Fighting Ships 1947–1995. Annapolis, Maryland USA: Naval Institute Press, 1995. .

Ships built in Italy
1960 ships
Bergamini-class frigates